Greenwich  is a lightvessel station in the English Channel, off the coast of East Sussex. It is operated by Trinity House. It is one of the 22 coastal weather stations whose conditions are reported in the BBC Shipping Forecast but was dropped from broadcasts some time during 2019, before being reinstated. The name of the station derives from the fact that is located close to the Greenwich (or Prime) Meridian.

The vessel currently on this station is the solar powered Trinity House Lightvessel No. 5, built in 1946 and in active service at various stations around the British coast since 1947.

References

Lightships of the United Kingdom
Lighthouses of the English Channel
1946 ships
Lightship stations